Lee Je-no (born April 23, 2000), known professionally as Jeno, is a South Korean rapper, singer, dancer, and television host. Jeno began his career as a child commercials model. He was discovered by SM Entertainment at the age of thirteen. Jeno officially debuted in August 2016 as a member of South Korean boy group NCT through the sub-unit NCT Dream, which went on to become one of the best-selling boy bands in South Korea.

Jeno hosted the television program The Show from May 2018 to November 2019.

Career

Pre-debut activities 
Jeno began his career as a child model in various commercials in South Korea throughout his childhood.

Jeno was introduced as one of the first members of SM Entertainment's pre-debut team, SM Rookies, on December 3, 2013. In 2014, he made his first appearance as a member of SM Rookies, alongside fellow NCT members Mark, Jaemin, Haechan and Jisung, on Exo 90:2014, a reality TV Show starring Exo. In 2015, he appeared as a Mouseketeer alongside other SM Rookies members on Disney Channel Korea's show The Mickey Mouse Club, which aired from July 23 to December 17, 2015.

2016–present: Debut with NCT 
On August 24, 2016, Jeno debuted in NCT Dream, the third sub-unit of NCT. Jeno, along with NCT Dream, participated in NCT's first album, NCT 2018 Empathy, with the single "Go". On May 22, 2018, SBS MTV's The Show announced Jeno was chosen as a new MC. Besides contributing vocals to NCT Dream's songs, Jeno also began writing lyrics on the song "Dear Dream" for the NCT Dream's second EP We Go Up, alongside members Mark, Jaemin and Jisung. Jeno has since written lyrics for tracks on NCT Dream's subsequent albums.

On March 13, 2019, Jeno, alongside fellow NCT Dream members Jaemin and Jisung, represented K-pop stars at the "K-Wave & Halal Show" in Malaysia. The friendship event between South Korea and Malaysia was attended by President Moon Jae-in as part of his three-day state visit to the country. On November 23, 2020, Jeno joined NCT's rotational unit NCT U with the release of their lead track "Misfit" from NCT's second album, Resonance Pt. 1, and the lead single "90's Love" from Resonance Pt. 2.

In 2021, Jeno featured on Donghae's song "California Love". In August 2022, Jeno featured on Key's song "Villain". In December 2022, Jeno featured on "Hot & Cold" from 2022 Winter SM Town: SMCU Palace alongside labelmates Kai, Seulgi and Aespa's Karina.

Other ventures

Modeling 
On September 13, 2022, Jeno became the first K-pop artist to be the opening model for a New York Fashion Week show, walking for Peter Do's spring 2023 collection show as part of a partnership with SM Entertainment, with whom Peter Do collaborated to create the line. The Business of Fashion commented that it "may have been the most-anticipated show of the week" and praised Do's tailoring, highlighting the back of the garments, and ability "to reference other designers through his own work without it feeling soulless".

Philanthropy 
In May 2019, Jeno, along with fellow NCT Dream member Jaemin, volunteered to visit children living in slums in Indonesia in collaboration with the non-governmental organizations Good Neighbours International and Gugah Nurani Indonesia Foundation.

Discography

Filmography

Television

Songwriting credits 
All credits are adapted from the Korea Music Copyright Association, unless stated otherwise.

Notes

References

External links 
 Lee Je-no at SM Town

K-pop singers
NCT (band) members
SM Rookies members
2000 births
21st-century South Korean male singers
Living people
People from Incheon
Musicians from Incheon